Liquid helium is a physical state of helium at very low temperatures at standard atmospheric pressures. Liquid helium may show superfluidity.

Its boiling point and critical point depend on which isotope of helium is present: the common isotope helium-4 or the rare isotope helium-3. These are the only two stable isotopes of helium. See the table below for the values of these physical quantities.

Liquefaction
Helium was first liquefied on July 10, 1908, by the Dutch physicist Heike Kamerlingh Onnes at the University of Leiden in the Netherlands. At that time, helium-3 was unknown because the mass spectrometer had not yet been invented. In more recent decades, liquid helium has been used as a cryogenic refrigerant (which is used in cryocoolers), and liquid helium is produced commercially for use in superconducting magnets such as those used in magnetic resonance imaging (MRI), nuclear magnetic resonance (NMR), Magnetoencephalography (MEG), and experiments in physics, such as low temperature Mössbauer spectroscopy. The Large Hadron Collider contains superconducting magnets that are cooled with 120 Tonnes of liquid helium.

Liquefied helium-3

A helium-3 atom is a fermion and at very low temperatures, they form two-atom Cooper pairs which are bosonic and condense into a superfluid. These Cooper pairs are substantially larger than the interatomic separation.

Characteristics
The temperature required to produce liquid helium is low because of the weakness of the attractions between the helium atoms. These interatomic forces in helium are weak to begin with because helium is a noble gas, but the interatomic attractions are reduced even more by the effects of quantum mechanics. These are significant in helium because of its low atomic mass of about four atomic mass units. The zero point energy of liquid helium is less if its atoms are less confined by their neighbors. Hence in liquid helium, its ground state energy can decrease by a naturally occurring increase in its average interatomic distance. However at greater distances, the effects of the interatomic forces in helium are even weaker.

Because of the very weak interatomic forces in helium, the element remains a liquid at atmospheric pressure all the way from its liquefaction point down to absolute zero. At temperatures below their liquefaction points, both helium-4 and helium-3 undergo transitions to superfluids. (See the table below.) Liquid helium can be solidified only under very low temperatures and high pressures.

Liquid helium-4 and the rare helium-3 are not completely miscible. Below 0.9 kelvin at their saturated vapor pressure, a mixture of the two isotopes undergoes a phase separation into a normal fluid (mostly helium-3) that floats on a denser superfluid consisting mostly of helium-4. This phase separation happens because the overall mass of liquid helium can reduce its thermodynamic enthalpy by separating.

At extremely low temperatures, the superfluid phase, rich in helium-4, can contain up to 6% of helium-3 in solution. This makes the small-scale use of the dilution refrigerator possible, which is capable of reaching temperatures of a few millikelvins.

Superfluid helium-4 has substantially different properties from ordinary liquid helium.

History
In 1908, the Dutch physicist Kamerlingh-Onnes succeeded in liquifying a small quantity of helium. In 1923, he provided advice to the Canadian physicist John Cunningham McLennan, who was the first to produce quantities of liquid helium almost on demand.

Important early work on the characteristics of liquid helium was done by the Soviet physicist Lev Landau, later extended by the American physicist Richard Feynman.

Data

Gallery

See also 

Cryogenics
Expansion ratio
Industrial gas
Liquid nitrogen
Liquid oxygen
Liquid hydrogen
Liquid air
Superfluid
Superfluid helium-3
Superfluid helium-4
Supersolid
2008 Large Hadron Collider liquid helium leak

References

General

Freezing Physics: Heike Kamerlingh Onnes and the Quest for Cold, Van Delft Dirk (2007). Edita - The Publishing House Of The Royal Netherlands Academy of Arts and Sciences. .

External links
He-3 and He-4 phase diagrams, etc.
Helium-3 phase diagram, etc.
Onnes's liquifaction of helium
Kamerlingh Onnes's 1908 article, online and analyzed on BibNum [for English analysis, click 'à télécharger']
CERN's cryogenic systems.

 
Helium, liquid
Coolants
Cryogenics
Helium
Industrial gases
Science and technology in the Netherlands
Dutch inventions
1908 in science
Superfluidity